Elsa Ruegger (December 6, 1881 – February 19, 1924), later Elsa Ruegger-Lichtenstein, was a Swiss cellist, billed as "the greatest woman cellist in the world."

Early life 
Elsa Ruegger was born in Lucerne. Her father Julius Ruegger was a government official, and her mother was a music teacher before marriage. Her sisters Valerie (Wally) and Charlotte were also musicians. She started learning the violin as a small girl, but transitioned to cello while still young. She studied with Édouard Jacobs and Anna Campowski at the Royal Conservatory of Brussels, and gave her first public concert in Brussels in 1992, at age 11.

Career 
Ruegger made a concert tour in Switzerland with her sisters in her teens. In 1895, she played in Berlin, and from there toured more widely as a solo artist. Her London debut came in 1897. In 1899 she was compared to American cellist Leonora Jackson. She helped her mother open a music school in Brussels in 1902.

Elsa Ruegger played with the Boston Symphony in 1903, and with the New York Philharmonic in 1907, then toured the United States performing with British tenor Cecil James, and American violinist Francis MacMillen. "Miss Ruegger possesses poetic gifts of the highest order and is blessed with the true artist temperament," declared one American reviewer in 1907.

From 1908 to 1912 she was a member of the Detroit String Quartet. She played on the American vaudeville stage from 1912 to 1921. She toured with harpist Zhay Clark in 1917 and 1918. She taught music in Brussels in 1921 and 1922. Although she was billed as "the greatest woman 'cellist in the world", she did not like the description. "I don't believe that it is possible to draw any sex line in art," she told a Detroit newspaper in 1908.

Personal life 
Elsa Ruegger married violinist Edmund Lichtenstein in 1908. She died in 1924, aged 42 years, in Chicago. Her gravesite is in Detroit.

References

External links 

 A 1918 photograph of Elsa Ruegger, by Edmund Lichtenstein, in the J. Willis Sayre Collection of Theatrical Photographs, University of Washington Libraries.
 A photograph of Elsa Ruegger, in the collection of the Fine Arts Museum of San Francisco.

1881 births
1924 deaths
People from Lucerne
Women cellists
Swiss cellists
20th-century cellists
Swiss emigrants to the United States